Shrek is a 1994 album by Marc Ribot recorded and released by the Japanese Avant label in 1994.

Recording
The album was recorded in New York City at Low Blood Studios. Ribot stated "I made Shrek, which was finally a hit. It was the most purely compositional record I had made. It’s quasi-unlistenable. ... I never knew how many Shrek fans there were till I did Cubanos. They’re coming out of the woodwork.".

Reception

AllMusic awarded the album 3 stars with reviewer Sean Cooper stating, "The group's debut shifts restlessly among animated jazz, rock, punk, and warped blues themes, filling the inevitable cracks with instrumental textures, minimal vignettes, and formless noise, similar in some respects to John Zorn's Naked City (though with considerably more focus...hell, with focus period!). The group is joined on three tracks by sampler collage artist David Shea. ".

In JazzTimes Tom Terrell said "Shrek is firmly in the avant garde camp. Over ten tracks, Ribot and Shrek the band cause wreck, eschewing identifiably standard song structures for a blurry continuum of multi-layered sounds, skewed rhythms and extraterrestrial transmissions. An intense exercise in wild gravity, Shrek careens madly from the pointillistic Frippertronics of 'Forth World' to the grim claustrophobia of 'Romance.' Well worth the listen-just don't look for a melody".

Track listing

Personnel 

Marc Ribot – guitars, banjo, Eb horn, drums, pump organ
Chris Wood – guitar on all tracks except "Prelude" and "Half Ass Whole"
David Shea – sampler on "Spigot", "Half Ass Whole" and "Human Sacrifice"
Sebastian Steinberg – bass on all tracks except "Prelude" and "Half Ass Whole"
Jim Pugliese – drums on all tracks except "Prelude" and "Half Ass Whole"
Christine Bard – drums on all tracks except "Prelude", "Spigot" and "Half Ass Whole"
Marc Anthony Thompson – autoharp on "Half Ass Whole"

References 

1994 albums
Marc Ribot albums
Avant Records albums